GLF may refer to:

Transportation 
 Glenfinnan railway station, in Scotland
 Golfito Airport, in Costa Rica

Other uses 

 Gay Liberation Front
 Global Landscapes Forum
 Global Leadership Foundation
 Glock Large Frame, a frame pattern for pistols chambered in 10mm Auto and .45 ACP, for example
 Grange League Federation, now Agway, an American agricultural business
 Great Leap Forward
 Swedish Recording Industry Association (Swedish )